Ivan Cotroneo (born 21 February 1968) is an Italian writer, scriptwriter and director, known for I Am Love, Kryptonite! and Loose Cannons.

Biography
After abandoning his law studies he moved to Rome, where he graduated in scriptwriting from the Experimental Center of Cinematography in 1992. His first experience in the film industry was working the director Pappi Corsicato, for whom Cotroneo wrote the episode 'La stirpe di Iana' of collective film The Vesuvians and the screenplay for the feature film Chimera.

Cotroneo has worked as a writer for several television productions such as drama and TV miniseries on Italian television. In addition to film and television, Cotroneo also works for the theater, adapting the Italian edition of Closer by Patrick Marber and The Rules of Attraction by Bret Easton Ellis and writing some comedy shows. He wrote the Claudio Gioè monologue "If you are here tonight".

Cotroneo published a collection of essays Il piccolo libro della rabbia (The Little Book of Anger) in 1999. His first novel l re del mondo (The King of the World) was published in 2003.

He co-wrote the screenplay of the film Loose Cannons with Ferzan Ozpetek in 2009. This screenplay won him Italian Golden Globe in 2010 for Best Screenplay. He was also nominated for David di Donatello and Silver Ribbon awards in 2010.

Cotroneo directed his first movie Kryptonite! in 2011. Cotroneo second directorial feature is the film One Kiss, based on his own book with the same name, released in Italian cinemas on March 31, 2016.

Partial filmography

Director and Writer
 Kryptonite! (2011)
 Il Natale della mamma imperfetta (2013)
 One Kiss (2016)

Writer
 In the Beginning There Was Underwear (1999)
 Chimera (2001)
 Paz! (2002)
 Ginger and Cinnamon (2003)
 Piano, solo (2007)
 The Man Who Loves (2008)
 I Am Love (2009)
 The Front Line (2009)
 Loose Cannons (2010)
 A Five Star Life (2013)
 Me, Myself and Her (2015)

Bibliography
 1999 - Il piccolo libro della rabbia (The Little Book of Anger ), Bompiani, 
 2003 - Il re del mondo (The King of the World ), Bompiani, 
 2005 - Cronaca di un disamore (Chronicles of a Lack of Love ), Bompiani, 
 2007 - La kryptonite nella borsa (Kryptonite!), Bompiani, 
 2010 - Un bacio (One Kiss ), Bompiani,

References

External links
Ivan Cotroneo

Italian screenwriters
Italian film directors
Italian LGBT writers
1968 births
Film people from Naples
Living people
Italian male screenwriters